The Little Box Challenge was an engineering competition run by Google and the IEEE's Power Electronics Society. The original challenge was posted on July 22, 2014 with modifications on December 16, 2014 and March 23, 2015. Testing was in October 2015 at the National Renewable Energy Laboratory. From the 18 finalists, CE+T Power's team called Red Electrical Devils won the $1 million prize, which was awarded to them in March 2016.

The challenge was to build a power inverter that was about one tenth the size of the state-of-the-art at the time. It had to have an efficiency greater than 95 percent and handle loads of 2 kW. It also had to fit in a metal enclosure of no more than 40 cubic inches (the eponymous "little box") and withstand 100 hours of testing.

The goals of the competition were lower cost solar photovoltaic power, more efficient uninterruptible power supplies, affordable microgrids, and the ability to use an electric vehicle's battery as backup power during a power outage. Google also hoped a smaller inverter could make its data centers run more efficiently.

More than 100 international teams from university researchers and students to large companies and garage tinkerers entered the Google Little Box Challenge competition. Eighteen finalists were chosen in October 2015. These 18 teams entered the Challenge's final stretch by submitted their competition prototypes, which underwent Google's stringent test regimen. The results of this worldwide competition were announced at the ARPA-E 2016, March conference. Of the 18 finalists, only 3 teams passed every one of Google's test requirements, those being the top three finishers.

First Place Finisher - The Red Electrical Devils

(CE+T Power, Belgium) 
Olivier Bomboir, Paul Bleus, Fabrice Frebel, Thierry Joannès, François Milstein, Pierre Stassain, Christophe Geuzaine, Carl Emmerechts, Philippe Laurent

Second Place Finisher -  Schneider Electric Team

(France) 
Miao-xin Wang, Rajesh Ghosh, Srikanth Mudiyula, Radoslava Mitova, David Reilly, Milind Dighrasker, Sajeesh Sulaiman, Alain Dentella, Damir Klikic, Chandrashekar Devalapuraramegowda, Michael Hartmann, Vijaykumar Atadkar

Third Place Finisher - Future Energy Electronics Center

(Virginia Tech, USA) 
Jih-Sheng Lai, Lanhua Zhang, Xiaonan Zhao, Rachael Born, Chung-Yi Lin, Ming-Chang Chou, Shu-Shuo Chang, Kye Yak See

Remaining finalists

!verter

(Germany/Switzerland/Slovenia) 
Eckart Hoene, Johann W. Kolar, Dominik Bortis, Yanick Lobsiger, Dominik Neumayr, Oliver Knecht, Florian Krismer, Stefan Hoffmann, Adam Kuczmik, Oleg Zeiter, Franc Zajc

Adiabatic Logic

(UK) 
Geoff Harvey, Alan Willybridge, Steve Love

AHED

(Germany) 
Alexander Huenten

AMR

(Argentina) 
Agustin Reibel

Cambridge Active Magnetics

(UK) 
John Wood, Ed Shelton, Tim Regan, Ellen Wood, Kyle Rogers, Dr Kevin Rathbone, Sam Harrup

Energylayer

(Ukraine) 
Evgeny Sboychakov, Ruslan Kotelnikov

Fraunhofer IISB

(Germany) 
Bernd Eckardt, Stefan Endres, Maximilian Hofmann, Stefan Matlok, Thomas Menrath, Martin März, Stefan Zeltner

Helios

(USA) 
Jack Zhu, Mari Ma

LBC1

(Slovakia) 
Martin Pietka, Andrej Teren, Marian Vranka, Lubos Drozd, Peter Sedlacko

OKE-Services

(Netherlands) 
Henk Oldenkamp

Rompower

(USA/Romania) 
Ionel Jitaru, Nicolae Daniel Bolohan, Antonio Marco Davila

The University of Tennessee

(USA) 
Daniel Costinett, Leon Tolbert, Fred Wang, Chongwen Zhao, Bradford Trento, Ling Jiang, Rick Langley, John Jansen, Reid Kress, Anthony Brun

Tommasi - Bailly 3NERGY

(France) 
Mike Tommasi, Alain Bailly

UIUC Pilawa Group

(USA) 
Robert Pilawa, Shibin Qin, Christopher Barth, Yutian Lei, Wen-Chuen Liu, Andrew Stillwell, Intae Moon, Derek Chou, Thomas Foulkes

Venderbosch

(Netherlands) 
Herbert Venderbosch, Gerard Bruggink

See also
 Solar micro-inverter

References

External links
 Google's announcement of the winner
 Official web site of the competition
 Official web site of the winning team

Electric power conversion
Engineering competitions
Student competitions